The Swiss Alpine Museum is a museum dedicated to the nature and culture of the Swiss Alps. It is located at Helvetiaplatz 4 in Bern.

History
The Swiss Alpine Museum was founded in 1905 by the Bernese section of the Swiss Alpine Club in the Rathaus zum Äusseren Stand on Zeughausgasse. The museum moved into its current premises on Helvetiaplatz in 1933. Built by architects Klauser and Streit in the Neues Bauen style, the building responds to the 1918 Kunsthalle Bern across the road. The museum underwent a renovation and restoration from 1990 to 1993.

Since 1933, the museum has been constituted as a foundation supported by the Swiss Alpine Club, the University of Bern, swisstopo, the Federal Office of the Environment, and the Office of Culture of the Canton of Bern. Its annual budget of some CHF 1.8 million is funded to approximately 60 percent by public subsidies. In 2008, the museum's continued existence was threatened by a dispute between federal agencies about the responsibility for its funding, until the federal parliament intervened by mandating the required expenditures.

Collection
The  Museum displays exhibits concerning the geology, tectonics, glaciology, meteorology, flora, fauna, cartography, agriculture, folklore, settlement, alpinism, tourism, winter sports, endangerment and protection of or in the Alps, as well as visual art relating to the Alps. Its collection, which is registered as a cultural property of national significance, contains some 20,000 objects, 160,000 photographs, 600 prints and 180 paintings by artists such as Ferdinand Hodler, and the world's largest collection of raised-relief maps.

References

External links 

Swiss Alps
Cultural property of national significance in the canton of Bern
Museums in Bern
Natural history museums in Switzerland
Alps museums